"Stick to the Status Quo" is a song from the Disney Channel Original Movie High School Musical. The song also appears on the soundtrack by the same name. It is sung by the minor cast of High School Musical after it is discovered that Troy Bolton auditioned for the winter musical Twinkle Towne. The song was also included in performances of High School Musical: The Concert, and its live album (2007). The song expresses frustration at the social hierarchy known as cliques for not allowing individuals from different cliques to interact or share interests, therefore the characters' verses challenge the status quo while the song's chorus defends it.

Charts and certifications

Weekly charts

Certifications

References

2006 songs
Ashley Tisdale songs
Songs from High School Musical (franchise)
Social groups